Andrzej Sekuła (born December 19, 1954) is a Polish cinematographer and film director, known for his work on various critically acclaimed films throughout the 1990s.

Career

Born in Wrocław, Poland in 1954, he emigrated to Los Angeles in 1980. After working on several short films, he shot his first feature-length theatrical film in the form of Quentin Tarantino's directorial debut Reservoir Dogs. He would go on to shoot Tarantino's 1994 Best Picture-nominated Pulp Fiction. He made his directorial debut with the 1998 thriller Fait Accompli. Other films shot by him include American Psycho, Hackers, Vacancy, and Armored.

Filmography

References

External links 
 

1954 births
Living people
Film people from Wrocław
Polish emigrants to the United States
Polish cinematographers
Polish film directors